Republic Plaza is a skyscraper in Denver, Colorado. Rising 717 feet (219 m), the building currently stands as the tallest building in the city of Denver and the entire Rocky Mountain region of the United States. It was built in 1984, and contains 56 floors, the majority of which are used as office space. Republic Plaza currently stands as the 137th-tallest building in the United States.

Designed by Skidmore, Owings & Merrill and built of reinforced concrete clad in Sardinian granite, Republic Plaza includes  of office space, and three retail levels containing shops, restaurants, and service businesses. The building has a 3-story marble lobby that features a quarterly "Art in Public Places" program of Colorado and regional artists.

On October 27, 2007, the building's top 20 stories were lit in purple with giant white letters "C" and "R" to celebrate the Colorado Rockies' World Series debut.

The Republic Plaza was built by PCL Construction Services, Inc.

The Republic Plaza is the former home to the American Lung Association in Colorado's "Anthem Fight for Air Climb". Now it is home to the "Mile High Stair Climb", benefitting the American Lung Association in Colorado. Held on the last Sunday of January, the event is a 56-story stair climb to the top of the building with the option of climbing more flights for up to a full vertical mile. On March 7, 2017 Plant Holdings North America, Inc. purchased the property.



Gallery

See also
 List of tallest buildings in Denver
 List of tallest buildings by U.S. state

References

External links

 Official website

Office buildings completed in 1984
Skyscraper office buildings in Denver
Skidmore, Owings & Merrill buildings
Brookfield Properties buildings
1984 establishments in Colorado